The Men's +105 kg weightlifting event at the 2018 Commonwealth Games took place at the Carrara Sports and Leisure Centre on 9 April 2018.

Records
Prior to this competition, the existing world, Commonwealth and Games records were as follows:

The following records were established during the competition:

Schedule
All times are Australian Eastern Standard Time (UTC+10)

Results

References

Weightlifting at the 2018 Commonwealth Games